Chaetocrania antennalis is a species of fly in the family Tachinidae.

References

Diptera of North America
Insects described in 1897
Tachinidae